Varuna is a Hindu god, associated with the sky, oceans and water. In the Vedic scriptures, he is paired with the god Mitra and is the lord of Ṛta (justice) and Satya (truth).   Varuna is also mentioned as an Aditya, the sons of the goddess Aditi.

In the later Hindu texts like the Puranas, Varuna is also a Dikpala or guardian of the western direction. He is depicted as a youthful man, mounted on Makara (crocodile) and holding a Pasha (noose, rope loop) and a pitcher in his hands. He has multiple wives and fathered many children, including the Vedic sage Vasishtha.

He is also mentioned in the Tamil grammar work Tolkāppiyam, as Kadalon the god of sea and rain. He is found in Japanese Buddhist mythology as Suiten. He is also found in Jainism.

Etymology 

In Hindu tradition, the theonym Váruṇa (Devanagari: वरुण) is described as a derivation from the verbal root vṛ ("to surround, to cover" or "to restrain, bind") by means of a suffixal -uṇa-, for an interpretation of the name as  "he who covers or binds", in reference to the cosmological ocean or river encircling the world, but also in reference to the "binding" by universal law or Ṛta.

Georges Dumézil (1934) made a cautious case for the identity of Varuna and the Greek god Ouranos at the earliest Indo-European cultural level.
The etymological identification of the name Ouranos with the Sanskrit Varuṇa is based in the derivation of both names from the PIE root *ŭer with a sense of "binding" – the Indic king-god Varuṇa binds the wicked, the Greek king-god Ouranos binds the Cyclopes. This derivation of the Greek name is now widely rejected in favour of derivation from the root  *wers- "to moisten, drip" (Sanskrit vṛṣ "to rain, pour").

Hindu texts

Vedas 
In the earliest layer of the Rigveda, Varuna is the guardian of moral law, one who punishes those who sin without remorse, and who forgives those who err with remorse. He is mentioned in many Rigvedic hymns, such as 7.86–88, 1.25, 2.27–30, 8.8, 9.73 and others. His relationship with waters, rivers and oceans is mentioned in the Vedas. Rig veda 10.123 says Hiranyapaksha (golden winged bird) as the messenger of Varuna. The golden winged messenger bird of Varuna may not be a mythical one but most probably flamingos because they have colourful wings and the sukta further describes Vulture as the messenger of Yama, the beaks of both these birds have similar morphology and flamingos are seen nearby seashores and marshlands.

Varuna and Mitra are the gods of the societal affairs including the oath, and are often twinned Mitra-Varuna. Both Mitra and Varuna are classified as Asuras in the Rigveda (e.g. RV 5.63.3), although they are also addressed as Devas as well (e.g. RV 7.60.12). Varuna, being the king of the Asuras, was adopted or made the change to a Deva after the structuring of the primordial cosmos, imposed by Indra after he defeats Vrtra.

According to Doris Srinivasan, a professor of Indology focusing on religion, Varuna-Mitra pair is an ambiguous deity just like Rudra-Shiva pair. Both have wrathful-gracious aspects in Indian mythology. Both Varuna and Rudra are synonymous with "all comprehensive sight, knowledge", both were the guardian deity of the north in the Vedic texts (Varuna later gets associated with west), both can be offered "injured, ill offerings", all of which suggest that Varuna may have been conceptually overlapping with Rudra. Further, the Rigvedic hymn 5.70 calls Mitra-Varuna pair as rudra, states Srinivasan. According to Samuel Macey and other scholars, Varuna had been the more ancient Indo-Aryan deity in 2nd millennium BCE, who gave way to Rudra in the Hindu pantheon, and Rudra-Shiva became both "timeless and the god of time".

In Vajasaneyi Samhita 21.40 (Yajurveda), Varuna is called the patron deity of physicians, one who has "a hundred, a thousand remedies". His capacity and association with "all comprehensive knowledge" is also found in the Atharvaveda (~1000 BCE). Varuna also finds a mention in the early Upanishads, where his role evolves. In verse 3.9.26 of the Brihadaranyaka Upanishad (~800 BCE), for example, he is stated to be the god of the western quarter, but one who is founded on "water" and dependent ultimately on "the heart" and the fire of soul. In the Katha Upanishad, Aditi is identified to be same as the goddess earth. She is stated in the Vedic texts to be the mother of Varuna and Mitra along with other Vedic gods, and in later Hindu mythology she as mother earth is stated to be mother of all gods.

In Yajurveda it is said: "In fact Varuna is Vishnu and Vishnu is Varuna and hence the auspicious offering is to be made to these deities." || 8.59 ||

Upanishads 
Varuna, addressed as Varuni explained Brahman in Taittiriya Upanishad to sage Bhrigu. First six anuvakas of Bhrigu Valli are called Bhargavi Varuni Vidya, which means "the knowledge Bhrigu got from (his father) Varuni". It is in these anuvakas that sage Varuni advises Bhrigu with one of the oft-cited definition of Brahman, as "that from which beings originate, through which they live, and in which they re-enter after death, explore that because that is Brahman". This thematic, all encompassing, eternal nature of reality and existence develops as the basis for Bhrigu's emphasis on introspection, to help peel off the outer husks of knowledge, in order to reach and realize the innermost kernel of spiritual Self-knowledge.

Ramayana 

Rama interacts with Varuna in the Hindu epic Ramayana. For example, faced with the dilemma of how to cross the ocean to Lanka, where his abducted wife Sita is held captive by the demon king Ravana, Rama (an Avatar of Vishnu) performs a pravpavesha (prayer, tapasya) to Varuna, the Lord of Oceans, for three days and three nights, states Ramesh Menon. Varuna does not respond, and Rama arises on the fourth morning, enraged. He states to his brother Lakshamana that "even lords of the elements listen only to violence, Varuna does not respect gentleness, and peaceful prayers go unheard".

With his bow and arrow, Rama prepares to attack the oceans to dry up the waters and create a bed of sand for his army of monkeys to cross and thus confront Ravana. Lakshmana appeals to Rama, translates Menon, that he should return to "peaceful paths of our fathers, you can win this war without laying waste the sea". Rama shoots his weapon sending the ocean into flames. As Rama increases the ferocity of his weapons, Varuna arises out of the oceans. He bows to Rama, stating that he himself did not know how to help Rama because the sea is deep, vast and he cannot change the nature of sea. Varuna asked Rama to remember that he is "the soul of peace and love, wrath does not suit him". Varuna promised to Rama that he will not disturb him or his army as they build a bridge and cross over to Lanka. Although, most of the sources claim it was Samudra, the god of the oceans who met Rama not the water god Varuna.

In Tolkappiyam 
The Tolkāppiyam, a Tamil grammar work from 3rd century BCE divides the people of ancient Tamilakam into five Sangam landscape divisions: kurinji, mullai, paalai, marutham and neithal. Each landscape is designated with different gods. Neithal is described as a seashore landscape occupied by fishermen and seatraders, with the god of sea and rain, Varunan or Kadalōn. "Varuna" means water which denotes the ocean in the Tamil language.

Festivals

Cheti Chand
The Cheti Chand festival in the Hindu month of Chaitra marks the arrival of spring and harvest, but in Sindhi Hindu community, it also marks the mythical birth of Uderolal in the year 1007. Uderolal morphed into a warrior and old man who preached and reprimanded Mirkhshah that Muslims and Hindus deserve the same religious freedoms. He, as Jhulelal, became the saviour of the Sindhi Hindus, who according to this legend, celebrate the new year as Uderolal's birthday.

Chaliya saheb
Chalio or Chaliho, also called Chaliho Sahib, is a forty-day-long festival celebrated by Sindhi Hindus to express their gratitude to Jhulelal for saving them from their impending conversion to Islam. The festival is observed every year in the months of July to August; dates vary according to Hindu calendar. It is a thanksgiving celebration in honor of Varuna Deva for listening to their prayers.

Narali Poornima

Nārali Poornima is a ceremonial day observed by Hindu fishing communities in Maharashtra, India particularly around Mumbai and the Konkan coast. It is held on the full-moon day of the Hindu month of Shravan which falls around July or August. On this day offerings such as rice, flowers and coconuts as offered to Lord Varuna, the god of ocean and waters.

Beyond Hinduism and India

Sri Lankan Tamils (Karaiyar caste) 

Karaiyar is a Sri Lankan Tamil caste found mainly on the northern and eastern coastal areas of Sri Lanka, and globally among the Tamil diaspora.
They are traditionally a seafaring community that is engaged in fishing, shipment and seaborne trade. They fish mostly in deep seas, and employ gillnet and seine fishing methods. The Karaiyars were the major maritime traders and boat owners who among other things, traded with pearls, chanks, tobacco, and shipped goods overseas to countries such as India, Myanmar and Indonesia. The community known for their maritime history, are also reputed as a warrior caste who contributed as army and navy soldiers of Tamil kings. They were noted as the army generals and navy captains of the Aryacakravarti dynasty. The Karaiyars emerged in the 1980s as strong representatives of Sri Lankan Tamil nationalism. The nuclear leadership of the Liberation Tigers of Tamil Eelam have background in the wealthier enterprising section of the Karaiyars.

The word "Karaiyar" is derived from the Tamil language words karai ("coast" or "shore") and yar ("people"). The term Kareoi mentioned by 2nd century AD writer Ptolemy, is identified with the Tamil word "Karaiyar". The Portuguese and Dutch sources mentions them under the term Careas, Careaz, or Carias, which are terms denoting "Karaiyar".

Kurukulam, Varunakulam and Arasakulam were historically one of the significant clans of the Karaiyars. Kurukulam, meaning "clan of the Kuru", may be a reference to their origin from Kurumandalam (meaning "realm of Kuru's") of Southern India. They attribute their origin myth from the Kuru Kingdom, mentioned in Hindu epic Mahabharata. Some scholars derived Kurukulam from Kuru, the Tamil name for Jupiter. Varunakulam, meaning "clan of Varuna", is a reference to their maritime origin. Varuna is the god of sea and rain, mentioned in Vedic Literature, but also in Sangam literature as the principal deity of the Neithal Sangam landscape (i.e. littoral landscape). Arasakulam means "clan of kings". They used the Makara as emblem, the mount of their clan deity, the sea god Varuna, which was also seen on their flags.

Sindhi Hindus 

Jhulelal is believed by Sindhi Hindus to be an incarnation of Varuna. They celebrate the festival of Cheti Chand in his honor. The festival marks the arrival of spring and harvest, but in Sindhi community it also marks the birth of Uderolal in year 1007, after they prayed to Hindu god Varuna to save them from the persecution by tyrannical Muslim ruler named Mirkhshah. Uderolal morphed into a warrior and old man who preached and reprimanded Mirkhshah that Muslims and Hindus deserve the same religious freedoms. He, as Jhulelal, became the champion of the people in Sindh, from both religions. Among his Sufi Muslim followers, Jhulelal is known as "Khwaja Khizir" or "Sheikh Tahit". The Hindu Sindhi, according to this legend, celebrate the new year as Uderolal's birthday.

Buddhism

Theravada

The Pali Canon of the Theravada school recognizes Varuṇa (Sanskrit; Pali: Varuna) as a king of the devas and companion of Sakka, Pajāpati and Isāna. In the battle against the Asuras, the devas of Tāvatiṃsa were asked to look upon the banner of Varuna in order to have all their fears dispelled (S.i.219).

The Tevijja Sutta mentions him among Indra, Soma, Isāna, Pajāpati, Yama and Mahiddhi as gods that are invoked by the brahmins.

The Ātānātiya Sutta lists him among the Yakkha chiefs.

Buddhaghosa states (SA.i.262) that Varuna is equal in age and glory (vanna) with Sakka and takes the third seat in the assembly of devas.

Mahayana

In East Asian Buddhism, Varuna is a dharmapāla and often classed as one of the Twelve Devas (Japanese: Jūniten, 十二天). He presides over the western direction.

In Japan, he is called "Suiten" (水天 lit. "water deva"). He is included with the other eleven devas, which include Taishakuten (Śakra/Indra), Fūten (Vāyu), Emmaten (Yama), Rasetsuten (Nirṛti/Rākṣasa), Ishanaten (Īśāna), Bishamonten (Vaiśravaṇa/Kubera), Katen (Agni), Bonten (Brahmā), Jiten (Pṛthivī), Nitten (Sūrya/Āditya), and Gatten (Chandra).

Shinto 

Varuna is also worshipped in Japan's Shinto religion. One of the Shinto shrines dedicated to him is the Suitengū ("Palace of Suiten") in Tokyo. After the Japanese emperor issued the Shinbutsu bunri, the separation of Shinto and Buddhist practices as part of the Meiji Restoration, Varuna/Suiten was identified with the Japanese supreme God, Amenominakanushi.

See also 

 Ādityas
 Apam Napat
 Asura
 Guardians of the directions
 Hindu deities
 Mitra (Vedic)
 Mitra–Varuna
 Rigvedic deities
 Shukra
 The king and the god

Notes

References

External links 

 Asura Varuna, R. N. Dandekar (1939)
 Great Vayu and Greater Varuna, Mary Boyce (1993)

Asura
Adityas
Hindu gods
Lokapala
Rigvedic deities
Sea and river gods
Sky and weather gods
Underworld gods
Justice gods
Water and Hinduism